The first season of Cougar Town, an American television series, began airing on September 23, 2009, and concluded on May 19, 2010, after Modern Family and before Eastwick (TV series). Season one regular cast members include Courteney Cox, Christa Miller, Busy Philipps, Brian Van Holt, Dan Byrd, Ian Gomez, and Josh Hopkins. The sitcom was created by Bill Lawrence and Kevin Biegel.

The series began production on April 29, 2009. It was originally supposed to air on Tuesdays, but postponed to Wednesday nights.

Conception
Following the cancellation of Dirt, Courteney Cox wanted to return to broadcast television and do another comedy. Lawrence, who is best known as the creator of Scrubs and Spin City, was approached by Cox about "wanting to do something." While developing the concept of the show, Lawrence thought he would do a tryout with Cox on Scrubs, by guest-starring in the first three episodes of the eighth season. He wanted to see what it was like to work together (who thought that she was an easy and fun person to work with) and decided to go from there. Lawrence and Biegel, who worked together writing episode on Scrubs, came up with the concept of the show with Cox as a 40-year-old, newly single woman because he thought that it was a real "zeitgeist-y topic." He drew inspiration from his real-life wife, actress Christa Miller who also stars in the show as Ellie; Miller had previously worked with Cox as part of the story-arc of the three part Scrubs try-out. Lawrence told Cox that the show could be "high-risk, high-reward," although Cox decided to go for it. He added, "I rarely have this much trepidation because usually the only person I could let down is myself. I want to make it work for her." In addition, Lawrence was also a staff writer on Friends during the show's first season.

Before he pitched the idea to ABC, other titles for the show included 40 and Single and The Courteney Cox Show, which was eventually named Cougar Town because Lawrence thought that "the title is noisy and that people will be aware of this show." He felt that the risk of the title was that the audience wouldn't watch it because people would say "...the title bums me," commenting: "it's a risky roll of the dice ... We don't call women "cougars" in it. We certainly don't use the word beyond the unbelievably big cheat that the high school mascot is a cougar." Lawrence believed that with the subsequent scripts they'd be doing and the re-shoots in the pilot, the show would be "creatively satisfying." After he pitched the idea to ABC, they asked him to have a pilot ready to shoot by the end of January 2009. Lawrence and Biegel together wrote the script with Lawrence, who has written and directed many episodes on Scrubs, directing the episode. In casting beyond Cox, Lawrence created the character of Ellie for his wife, Christa Miller. Miller felt that her character started off "gleefully" and that her husband would write down little things that she would say, in which she believes is the reason her character "came out of that."

Crew
In addition to having created the series, Bill Lawrence is the show runner, head writer, and the executive producer. Courteney Cox, who also stars on the show, serves as executive producer alongside Lawrence. Lawrence, the executive producer, show runner, head writer and creator of Scrubs, co-wrote and directed the pilot and wrote the second episode. He has written for other shows that include, Friends, The Nanny, and Boy Meets World as well as co-created Spin City. Kevin Biegel, co-creator, has also written episode for Scrubs. He wrote 7 episodes on Scrubs and wrote the pilot script with Lawrence.

Filming
The series takes place at the fictional town of Gulf Haven in Sarasota County, Florida although it is filmed at Culver Studios in Culver City, California. The pilot episode was directed and written by Scrubs creator Bill Lawrence, who is married to Scrubs and Cougar Town star Christa Miller. Lawrence serves as executive producer/writer/director, Kevin Biegel as writer/co-executive producer, and Courteney Cox and David Arquette are executive producers. It is produced by Doozer Productions and Coquette Productions (headed by Cox and her husband David Arquette) and is from ABC Studios. The sitcom is filmed in the single-camera format. Cox filmed the pilot on March 19, 2009.

Reception
In the USA the audience dropped from 11 million to 6 million over the 14-episode run. In Australia the audience dropped from 1.3 to 1 million in one week after the chief executive of the Australian channel showing it (Seven Network) described it as a 'shit show' that he could get large audiences for, by promoting it. In late April 2010, Cougar Town was canned in Australia due to poor ratings; 10 episodes had been run. Recently, Channel 7 returned both Cougar Town and How I Met Your Mother to its schedule from June 17. Cougar Town aired after a repeat of How I Met Your Mother, managing just 433,000 viewers. They plan to continue showing it in double episodes until the end of Season 1. In late January 2011, Seven Network returned the show to a late timeslot of 10:30 Tuesday nights after a New Episode of Parenthood. In the UK, the first season aired on LIVING, and was shown in double-bills on Tuesday nights at 9pm. The season premiered on March 30, 2010, to a strong 802,000 viewers and concluded on June 15, 2010, to a series low of 593,000 viewers. However, the entire season was the most-watched show on LIVING, averaging 769,000 viewers.

Episodes

U.S. Nielsen ratings

Episode 9 aired on Thanksgiving Eve in which most of the original shows hit series lows.
Episode 14 was the first episode to air against the 9th season of American Idol.

See also
 List of Cougar Town episodes

References

General references 
 
 
 

2009 American television seasons
2010 American television seasons
Cougar Town seasons